The Lower Galilee is a region within the Northern District of Israel. The Lower Galilee is bordered by the Jezreel Valley to the south; the Upper Galilee to the north, from which it is separated by the Beit HaKerem Valley; the Jordan Rift Valley with the Jordan River and the Sea of Galilee to the east; and to the west, a segment of the Northern Coastal Plain known as the Zvulun Valley (Zebulon Valley), stretching between the Carmel ridge and Acre. The Lower Galilee is the southern part of the Galilee. In Josephus' time, it was known to stretch in breadth from Xaloth (Iksal) to Bersabe, and in length from Cabul to Tiberias, a region that contains around 470 km2. It is called "Lower" since it is less mountainous than the Upper Galilee. The tallest peaks are Mount Kamon at the northern part of the Lower Galilee, and Mount Tabor in the southern part.}

Geography
The Lower Galilee consists of three different regions which differ in their geological structure:
 The western Lower Galilee
 The central Lower Galilee
 The high regions of the eastern Lower Galilee

The central Lower Galilee consists of low mountain ranges which extend from east to west with several valleys in between; south of the Beit Kerem (Šagor) Valley is the Shagor mountain range, then Sakhnin valley, Yodfat range, Beit Netofa Valley, Tur'an valley and range, Nazareth range, and Ksulot valley. In the western part of the Lower Galilee there are several low hills (200–300 meters) covered with Oak tree forests, the central Lower Galilee region is more mountainous and the eastern Lower Galilee region turn into flat basalt mountainside reaching heights of 300 meters above sea level which extend from northeast to the southwest.

Although the landscape of the Lower Galilee is less dramatic than that of the Upper Galilee, it is greener, more peaceful and quiet. The Lower Galilee is more accessible to the majority of Israelis (less than a 2-hour drive from the Tel Aviv area). Much of the produce farms of Israel originates in the Lower Galilee, especially in the Jezreel Valley and the Beit She'an Valley.

Type of soil 
The soil of the Lower Galilee mainly consists of the following:

 Limestone - the lands in the central Lower Galilee region consists mainly of limestone which was created due to accumulation of shells and skeletons of marine life on the seabed.
 Brown Terra Rossa - the Lower Galilee region also have many areas which consists of this type of soil which has high amounts of minerals. The Terra Rossa is the basis for the development of forests in the Galilee because it has a large amount of mineral needed for the trees to grow.
 Basalt - the lands in the eastern Lower Galilee region (the area near the Golan Heights) consists mainly of basalt which is a type of rock that was created as a result of hot magma from erupted volcanoes which later cooled in temperature and became rock hard and impenetrable. The basalt areas also comprise very fertile soil.

Water resources 
Until 1932 the settlements in the eastern Lower Galilee were based solely on spring water which existed in proximity to the villages which were only enough for home use and therefore it was not possible to have irrigated agriculture in the Lower Galilee at the time. In 1932 the first Well drilling was done in the Yavne'el Valley which supplied irrigation water to Yavne'el. In 1942 a water pipeline was constructed from the Sea of Galilee to the village which as a result extended its amount of agricultural lands, which were based mainly on the new water sources, despite the relatively high cost of water at that time. During the first decade of the State of Israel the villages of the Lower Galilee were involved in a constant struggle with the government demanding that the government would solve their water problems. After several local Well drilling attempts made during those years failed water pipelines were laid from the Sea of Galilee to all villages in the Lower Galilee.

Gallery

See also
Galilee
Northern District (Israel)
Lower Galilee Regional Council
Upper Galilee

References

 
Historical regions in Israel
Regions of Israel